Ulrik Wilbek (born 13 April 1958, in Tunis, Tunisia) is a former Danish team handball coach and current politician, and mayor of Viborg. He is the most successful Danish team handball coach ever, having won 2 European championships with the men and 2 European championships, 1 World championship and 1 Olympic gold medal with the women.

He was the head coach for the Danish men's national handball team from 2005-2014. He led the Danish team to win the 2008 European Men's Handball Championship in Norway, the 2012 European Men's Handball Championship and obtained silver at the 2011 World Men's Handball Championship in Sweden, and bronze medals both at the 2006 European Men's Handball Championship in Switzerland and at the 2007 World Men's Handball Championship in Germany.

He is married to former handball player Susanne Munk Wilbek.

Handball coaching career

Women's national team
Wilbek's first international successes came as coach for the Danish Women's national youth team in the late 1980s. Here he first coached players like Anja Andersen and his wife-to-be Susanne Munk Lauritsen. A few years later, he was asked to be coach for the national A-team, which nearly was closed in the early 1990s due to bad results. Wilbek took the challenge and promoted a couple of the youth players, and the team had its first success as finalist in the 1993 World Women's Handball Championship, losing only after extra time.

In the following years, Wilbek was in the lead of the team, that became one of the most successful national handball teams of all times and at the same time one of the most popular teams in Danish sport. The team was European Champions in 1994 and won bronze medals at 1995 World Championship. The peak of the team was reached at the end of 1997, when the team was reigning World Champions (1997), European Champions (1996), and Olympic Champions (1996). This was the first time in handball history that a national team held all 3 major titles at the same time and only 2 other national teams have accomplished it since. It also marked the end of Wilbek's career as coach for the women's national team, having won everything.

Club handball
Wilbek's initial work as a handball coach was in his own club, Virum Sorgenfri Håndboldklub, in 1985–88 (elite men). Just turned 30, he came to Viborg HK as a coach for the ambitious women's team, which by then had just been promoted to the Danish top league. Within a few years, he led the club to their first medals (silver in 1991), and the Danish National team now wanted him as a coach for the women's team.

After five extremely successful years as national coach, Wilbek again turned towards club coaching. He was reappointed as coach for Viborg HK's elite women, and again he showed his excellence: The team became national champions for four consecutive years and reached the final in the 2001 EHF Champions League.

Men's national team
He now needed new challenges and turned towards the club's men's team in the early 2000s. This marked Wilbek's least successful period as a coach with no medals won.  But he was still popular within the national handball association, and in 2005 he was appointed coach of the national men's team. In 2006 he led the team to a 3rd-place finish at the European Championships and in 2007 they finished 3rd in The World Championship. In 2008 he led the team to first place in the 2008 European Men's Handball Championship.

Danish Handball Federation 
In 2016, after four years as a manager for the Danish Handball Federation DHF, Ulrik Wilbek was submitting his resignation to the federation.

The termination comes after the internal disturbances during the 2016 Summer Olympics , where Ulrik contacted bearing profiles of the men's national team to discuss coach Guðmundur Guðmundsson future before the finals and asked the players if they felt if the coach Guðmundsson was fired.Some days after this scandal,Denmark won the gold medal at the event. After the controversy, Ulrik handed over his responsibilities to others in DHF, and then used his energy on the local political work in Viborg.

Political career 
Ulrik Wilbek was a member of the city council of Viborg for the political party Venstre from 1998 to 2001.

After retiring from handball, he was elected to Viborg city council again in the municipal elections in November 2017. He has served as mayor of Viborg since January 2018.

References

1958 births
Living people
Danish handball coaches
Danish sportsperson-politicians
Olympic coaches
Medalists at the 1996 Summer Olympics
Olympic gold medalists for Denmark
Venstre (Denmark) politicians
People from Viborg Municipality
Sportspeople from Tunis